Koray is a Turkish given name. It is composed of "Kor" and "Ay". In Turkish "Kor" means "Ember" and "Ay" means "Moon". Thus, "Koray" means "a moon in the colour of ember".

Notable people with the name include:

Given name 
 Koray Aldemir, German poker player 
 Koray Ariş, Turkish sculptor
 Koray Arslan, Turkish footballer
 Koray Avcı (footballer), Turkish footballer
 Koray Avcı (musician), Turkish musician
 Koray Aydın, Turkish politician
 Koray Candemir, Turkish musician
 Koray Günter, German-Turkish footballer
 Koray Şanlı, Turkish footballer
 Koray Karakilic, Turkish Chef

Surname 
 Erkin Koray, Turkish rock musician
 Kenan Hulusi Koray, Turkish writer

Turkish masculine given names
Turkish-language surnames